Y2 may refer to:
 Boeing Y2, a next-generation aircraft project
 Greek submarine Papanikolis (Υ-2), a 1927 submarine